Nastasya Anislavovna Samburskaya  (born 1 March 1987) is a Russian actress, folk-singer and TV presenter. Best known for her role as Kristina Sokolovskaya in comedy television series "Univer".

Biography 
Nastasya Samburskaya was born in Priozersk, Leningrad Oblast, Russian SFSR, Soviet Union. After school Nastasya decided to first learn to be a stylist, hairdresser.

In 2010 she graduated from the Russian University of Theatre Arts - GITIS, workshop Sergey Golomazov, after which the group was invited to Malaya Bronnaya Theater, which serves as the moment.

The actress began her career in 2008. Since 2011, she has starred in the TV series Kristina Sokolovskaya Univer. New Dorm on TNT, playing a girl with a very complex character.

Filmography

External links 
 
 

1987 births
Living people
Russian film actresses
Russian television actresses
Russian television presenters
21st-century Russian actresses
Russian Academy of Theatre Arts alumni
Russian women television presenters